Radu Ţîrle (born 17 May 1967 in Criștioru de Jos, Bihor County) is a Romanian politician. He served in the European Parliament from 2005 to 2007, first as an Observer (before Romania joined the EU) and then as a Member of the European Parliament on behalf of the Democratic Party (EPP-ED). He later served as President of the County Council of Bihor, from 2008-2012. From 2004-2008, he served in the Romanian Parliament as a Senator.

External links
Radu Ţârle - official site
European Parliament profile
European Parliament official photo

1967 births
Living people
Democratic Liberal Party (Romania) politicians
Councillors in Romania
People from Bihor County
Democratic Liberal Party (Romania) MEPs
MEPs for Romania 2007
National Liberal Party (Romania) politicians